The 1964 Milan–San Remo cycling race took place on March 19, 1964, and was won by Peugeot–BP–Englebert's Tom Simpson, becoming the first British winner. It was the 55th edition of the Milan–San Remo "monument" classic race. Simpson set a record pace for the event at 43.420 km/h.

Results

References

1964
1964 in road cycling
1964 in Italian sport
March 1964 sports events in Europe
1964 Super Prestige Pernod